Stanislav Yuryevich Lopukhov (born 27 November 1972, Kaluga) is a retired men's breaststroke swimmer from Russia. He won the silver medal in the 4×100 metres medley relay at the 1996 Summer Olympics in Atlanta, Georgia.

See also
 List of Russian records in swimming

References
sports-reference

1972 births
Living people
Sportspeople from Kaluga
Russian male swimmers
Male breaststroke swimmers
Swimmers at the 1996 Summer Olympics
Olympic swimmers of Russia
Olympic silver medalists for Russia
Medalists at the FINA World Swimming Championships (25 m)
Medalists at the 1996 Summer Olympics
Olympic silver medalists in swimming
Recipients of the Medal of the Order "For Merit to the Fatherland" II class
United Russia politicians
Universiade medalists in swimming
Universiade gold medalists for Russia
Medalists at the 1995 Summer Universiade
Medalists at the 1997 Summer Universiade